Illinois Route 124 (IL 124) is a  state route in central Illinois. It has the distinction of being marked as an east–west route, but IL 124 runs entirely north–south for the majority of its route. IL 124 runs from IL 123 between Athens and Williamsville to the Business Loop for Interstate 55 (I-55) around Springfield at Sherman.

Route description 
Illinois 124 is a rural, two-lane surface street for its entire length.

History 
SBI Route 124 was what Illinois Route 29 is now from Springfield north to near Athens. In 1940 the route was changed to Illinois 29, and former Illinois Route 24 was changed to Illinois Route 124, running east from Athens to the current northern terminus, and south to the Business Loop. In October 2003, Illinois 123 was extended east to Williamsville, which eliminated the east–west portion  of Illinois 124.

Major intersections

References

External links

124
Transportation in Sangamon County, Illinois